Genoa C.F.C. enjoyed its best season in recent history and finished fifth in Serie A. Topscorer Diego Milito hit the back of the net 24 times, and earned a move to Inter prior to the 2009-10 season. The ex-player and 29-year-old Argentinian Milito, arrived from relegated Spanish side Real Zaragoza, and the returnee performed his best season yet. Thanks to his goals and Thiago Motta's midfield display, Genoa finished in the top 5, and nearly pipped Fiorentina to the final Champions League spot. Motta was also sold to Inter in the summer, which left a huge fold in the Genoa squad.

Squad

Goalkeepers
 1  Eugenio Lamanna
 12  Alessio Scarpi
 35  Rubinho

Defenders
 2  Alessandro Potenza
 3  Domenico Criscito
 4  Matteo Ferrari
 5  Sokratis Papastathopoulos
 42  Giuseppe Biava
 90  Salvatore Bocchetti
 95  Davide Brivio

Midfielders
 13  Nicolás Domingo
 7  Marco Rossi
 17  Marcel Román
 27  Andrea Gasbarroni
 30  Matteo Paro
 15  Giandomenico Mesto
 16  Francesco Modesto
 18  Ivan Jurić
 31  Stefano Botta
 40  Anthony Vanden Borre
 9  Omar Milanetto
 8  Thiago Motta

Attackers
 99  Giuseppe Sculli
 52  Luciano Figueroa
 24  Raffaele Palladino
 66   Rubén Olivera
 92  Boško Janković
 32  Davide Di Gennaro
 22  Diego Milito
 92  Stephan El Shaarawy

Serie A

Matches
 Catania-Genoa 1-0
 1-0 Giuseppe Mascara (60)
 Genoa-Milan 2-0
 1-0 Giuseppe Sculli (30)
 2-0 Diego Milito (90 + 1 pen)
 Palermo-Genoa 2-1
 1-0 Edinson Cavani (38)
 2-0 Cesare Bovo (58)
 2-1 Diego Milito (90)
 Genoa-Roma 3-1
 1-0 Giuseppe Sculli (4)
 1-1 Daniele De Rossi (28)
 2-1 Diego Milito (61)
 3-1 Diego Milito (87)
 Fiorentina-Genoa 1-0
 1-0 Alberto Gilardino (61)
 Genoa-Napoli 3-2
 0-1 Ezequiel Lavezzi (1)
 1-1 Sokratis Papastathopoulos (44)
 2-1 Raffaele Palladino (52)
 3-1 Diego Milito (73)
 3-2 Germán Denis (75)
 Genoa-Siena 1-0
 1-0 Giuseppe Biava (20)
 Inter-Genoa 0-0
 Genoa-Cagliari 2-1
 1-0 Sokratis Papastathopoulos (25)
 2-0 Thiago Motta (56)
 2-1 Paolo Bianco (66)
 Udinese-Genoa 2-2
 1-0 Gaetano D'Agostino (4 pen)
 1-1 Diego Milito (64 pen)
 1-2 Giuseppe Sculli (67)
 2-2 Fabio Quagliarella (78)
 Genoa-Reggina 4-0
 1-0 Diego Milito (54 pen)
 2-0 Diego Milito (74)
 3-0 Giuseppe Sculli (81)
 4-0 Diego Milito (90)
 Juventus-Genoa 4-1
 1-0 Zdeněk Grygera (6)
 2-0 Amauri (26)
 3-0 Vincenzo Iaquinta (85)
 3-1 Diego Milito (89 pen)
 4-1 Sokratis Papastathopoulos (90 + 2 og)
 Lazio-Genoa 1-1
 0-1 Diego Milito (69)
 1-1 Ousmane Dabo (80)
 Genoa-Bologna 1-1
 1-0 Giuseppe Sculli (55)
 1-1 Marco Di Vaio (63)
 Sampdoria-Genoa 0-1
 0-1 Diego Milito (50)
 Genoa-Atalanta 1-1
 0-1 Sergio Floccari (17)
 1-1 Giuseppe Sculli (86)
 Chievo-Genoa 0-1
 0-1 Rubén Olivera (89)
 Genoa-Torino 3-0
 1-0 Giuseppe Biava (18)
 2-0 Boško Janković (48)
 3-0 Thiago Motta (84)
 Lecce-Genoa 0-2
 0-1 Boško Janković (68)
 0-2 Giuseppe Sculli (90 + 2)
 Genoa-Catania 1-1
 0-1 Jorge Martínez (67)
 1-1 Diego Milito (73)
 Milan-Genoa 1-1
 1-0 David Beckham (33)
 1-1 Diego Milito (88)
 Genoa-Palermo 1-0
 1-0 Domenico Criscito (88)
 Roma-Genoa 3-0
 1-0 Cicinho (26)
 2-0 Mirko Vučinić (47)
 3-0 Júlio Baptista (90 + 2)
 Genoa-Fiorentina 3-3
 1-0 Thiago Motta (12)
 2-0 Raffaele Palladino (38)
 3-0 Diego Milito (56 pen)
 3-1 Adrian Mutu (60 pen)
 3-2 Adrian Mutu (80)
 3-3 Adrian Mutu (90 + 4)
 Napoli-Genoa 0-1
 0-1 Boško Janković (69)
 Siena-Genoa 0-0
 Genoa-Inter 0-2
 0-1 Zlatan Ibrahimović (2)
 0-2 Mario Balotelli (61)
 Cagliari-Genoa 0-1
 0-1 Rubén Olivera (85)
 Genoa-Udinese 2-0
 1-0 Giuseppe Sculli (59)
 2-0 Diego Milito (90 + 3)
 Reggina-Genoa 0-1
 0-1 Thiago Motta (77)
 Genoa-Juventus 3-2
 1-0 Thiago Motta (29)
 1-1 Alessandro Del Piero (45 pen)
 2-1 Thiago Motta (45 + 3)
 2-2 Vincenzo Iaquinta (84)
 3-2 Raffaele Palladino (88)
 Genoa-Lazio 0-1
 0-1 Mauro Zárate (65)
 Bologna-Genoa 2-0
 1-0 Marco Di Vaio (15 pen)
 2-0 Claudio Terzi (25)
 Genoa-Sampdoria 3-1
 1-0 Diego Milito (30)
 1-1 Hugo Campagnaro (45 + 3)
 2-1 Diego Milito (73)
 3-1 Diego Milito (90 + 3)
 Atalanta-Genoa 1-1
 1-0 Jaime Valdés (9)
 1-1 Domenico Criscito (90)
 Genoa-Chievo 2-2
 0-1 Giampiero Pinzi (35)
 1-1 Diego Milito (58 pen)
 2-1 Rubén Olivera (71)
 2-2 Sergio Pellissier (85)
 Torino-Genoa 2-3
 0-1 Diego Milito (32 pen)
 1-1 Ivan Franceschini (40)
 1-2 Rubén Olivera (48)
 2-2 Rolando Bianchi (49)
 2-3 Diego Milito (89)
 Genoa-Lecce 4-1
 1-0 Boško Janković (22)
 1-1 Simone Tiribocchi (32)
 2-1 Domenico Criscito (52)
 3-1 Diego Milito (56)
 4-1 Diego Milito (67)

Topscorers
  Diego Milito 24
  Thiago Motta 6
  Giuseppe Sculli 5
  Rubén Olivera 4
  Raffaele Palladino 3

External links
2008–09 Genoa C.F.C. season at ESPN

Genoa C.F.C. seasons
Genoa